Papaipema sauzalitae, the figwort stem borer, is a species of cutworm or dart moth in the family Noctuidae.

The MONA or Hodges number for Papaipema sauzalitae is 9474.

References

Further reading

 
 
 

Papaipema
Articles created by Qbugbot
Moths described in 1875